The Thirteenth Van Cliburn International Piano Competition took place in Fort Worth, Texas from May 22 to June 7, 2009. The competitors were selected by a screening jury during screening auditions that took place in January and February 2009. The Takács Quartet performed with the semifinalists, while the Fort Worth Symphony Orchestra conducted by James Conlon accompanied the finalists.

At the suggestion of composer John Corigliano, a 25-member nominating committee of distinguished musicians issued invitations to noted American composers to submit solo piano scores 8 to 12 minutes in length. Original works by American composers John Musto, Mason Bates, and Daron Hagen were chosen.

Competitors can meet Van Cliburn, a famous American pianist, who came in first place at the Tchaikovsky competition that took place in Moscow, Russia.

The Van Cliburn International Piano Competition is a quadrennial competition hosted by the Van Cliburn Foundation. The first competition took place September 24-October 7, 1962 in Fort Worth, Texas.

Jury
(* denotes members of screening audition jury)

  *John Giordano (chairman), Corpus Christi Symphony Orchestra music director
  *Marcello Abbado, concert pianist and composer
  Dimitri Alexeev, pianist
  Michel Béroff, pianist and conductor
  *Hung-Kuan Chen, pianist
  *Richard Dyer, classical music writer
  Joseph Kalichstein, pianist
  *Yoheved Kaplinsky, pianist and professor of piano
  Jürgen Meyer-Josten, pianist and radio executive
  Menahem Pressler, pianist and professor of music
  Tadeusz Strugala, conductor and professor of music

Awards

Competition results, by rounds

Screening Auditions
 Shanghai - Shanghai Conservatory, He Lu Ting Concert Hall, January 15–17, 2009

  Yunjie Chen
  Roger Longjie Cui
  Christine Luo
  Yoshito Numasawa
  Wenyu Shen
  Tom Tang
  Chun Wang
  Shiran Wang
  Tianyang Wang
  Zhefei Wang
  Chi Wu
  Yashuangzi Xie
  Chenxin Xu
  Feng Zhang
  Yu Zhang
  Ning Zhou
  Xixi Zhou

 Hanover - Hochschule für Musik und Theater Hannover, January 20–24, 2009

  Ron Abramski
  Hinrich Alpers
  Evgeni Bozhanov
  Evgeny Tcherepanov
  Jae-won Cheung
  Eugene Choi
  Romain David
  Martina Filjak
  Andreas Hering
  Soyeon Kim
  Natacha Kudritskaya
  Aleksey Lebedev
  Colleen Lee
  Tamara Licheli
   Michail Lifits
  Maria Masycheva
  Benjamin Moser
  Dmytro Onyschenko
  Satu Paavola
  Esther Park
   Marianna Prjevalskaya
  Ilya Rashkovsky
  Philippe Raskin
  Mayumi Sakamoto
  Louis Schwizgebel-Wang
  Yeol Eum Son
   Avan Yu

 Saint Petersburg - N.A. Rimsky-Korsakov State Conservatory, January 26–27, 2009

  Vladimir Farkov
  Vyacheslav Gryaznov
  Andrey Gugnin
  Sofya Gulyak
  Evgeny Izotov
  Vadym Kholodenko
  Yaron Kohlberg
  Asiya Korepanova
  Eduard Kunz
  Alexander Maslov
  Dinara Nadzhafova
  Alexandre Pirojenko
  Sergey Sobolev
  Kateryna Titova
  Alexander Yakovlev

 Lugano - Radiotelevisione Svizzera di lingua Italiana, February 1–3, 2009

  Gloria Campaner
  Alessandro Deljavan
   Dmitry Demyashkin
  François Dumont
  Gayane Gasparyan
  Irena Gulzarova
  Soyeon Ham
  Ching-Yun Hu
  Alexander Karpeyev
  Tatyana Kolesova
  Olga Kozlova
  István Lajkó
  Ji Liu
  Vikingur Olafsson
  Tristan Pfaff
  Matan Porat
  Timur Shcherbakov
  Marian Sobula
   Victor Stanislavsky
  Sujung Sun
  Alessandro Taverna
  Mariangela Vacatello
  Lukáš Vondráček
   Daniel Wnukowski
  Takashi Yamamoto
  William Youn
  Maurizio Zaccaria
  Maria Tcherpnov

 New York - Rockefeller University, February 12–14, 2009

  Evgeny Andreev
  Carlos Ávila
  Jan Bartoš
  Yelena Beriyeva
  Stephen Beus
  Yue Chu
  Ran Dank
  Gregory DeTurck
  Christopher Falzone
  Wael Farouk
  Anna Fedorova
  Tanya Gabrielian
  Pavel Gintov
  Yoonjung Han
  Miao Hou
  Gleb Ivanov
  Ilya Kazantsev
  Sean Kennard
  Ben Kim
  Kyu Yeon Kim
  Andrea Lam
  Soyeon Lee
  Dong-Hyek Lim
  Dong-Min Lim
  Edvinas Minkstimas
  Spencer Myer
  Hoang Pham
  Vassily Primakov
  Serhiy Salov
  Shohei Sekimoto
   Anna Shelest
  Konstantin Soukhovetski
  Diyi Tang
  Jue Wang
  Di Wu
  Hong Xu
   Ryo Yanagitani
  Amy Yang
  Einav Yarden
  Wei-Jen Yuan
  Haochen Zhang
  Eric Zuber
  Zhang Zuo
   Jenny Deborah Han

 Fort Worth, Texas - Texas Christian University, February 21–24, 2009

  Jun Asai
  Kristhyan Benítez
  Sara Daneshpour
  Tamas Ardi
  Christopher Guzmán
  Tanya Karyagyna
  Stanislav Khristenko
   Naomi Kudo
   Dmitri Levkovich
   Ang Li
  Anastasia Markina
  Dimitris Papadimitriou
  Eduardo Rojas
  Aleyson Scopel
  Andrew Staupe
  Young-Ah Tak
  Konstantyn Travinsky
  Nobuyuki Tsujii
  Vassilis Varvaresos
  Abdiel Vazquez
  Ti Xin
  Ilya Yakushev

Preliminary round
 Fort Worth, Texas - Bass Performance Hall, May 22–26, 2009

  Stephen Beus
  Evgeni Bozhanov
  Yue Chu (withdrew before Preliminary round due to hand injury)
  Ran Dank
  Alessandro Deljavan
  Yoonjung Han
  Kyu Yeon Kim
   Naomi Kudo
  Natacha Kudritskaya
  Eduard Kunz
  Andrea Lam
  Soyeon Lee
   Ang Li
   Michail Lifits
  Spencer Myer
  Ilya Rashkovsky
  Mayumi Sakamoto
  Yeol Eum Son
   Victor Stanislavsky
  Chetan Tierra
  Nobuyuki Tsujii
  Mariangela Vacatello
  Vassilis Varvaresos
  Lukáš Vondráček
  Di Wu
  Amy Yang
  Feng Zhang
  Haochen Zhang
  Ning Zhou
  Zhang Zuo

Semifinalists

  Evgeni Bozhanov
  Ran Dank
  Alessandro Deljavan
  Kyu Yeon Kim
  Eduard Kunz
  Andrea Lam
   Michail Lifits
  Yeol Eum Son
  Nobuyuki Tsujii
  Mariangela Vacatello
  Di Wu
  Haochen Zhang

Finalists

  Evgeni Bozhanov
  Yeol Eum Son
  Nobuyuki Tsujii
  Mariangela Vacatello
  Di Wu
  Haochen Zhang

Competition Documentary
Like previous Cliburn Competitions, a competition documentary was produced called A Surprise in Texas, directed by Peter Rosen who directed several previous Cliburn documentaries.  It premiered on April 11, 2010 at the Dallas International Film Festival and was broadcast nationwide in the USA on Public Broadcasting Service (PBS) television starting on September 1, 2010.

References

 Thirteenth Van Cliburn International Piano Competition website 

Van Cliburn International Piano Competition
Texas classical music
2009 in American music